Fern Michaels (born Mary Ruth Kuczkir; April 9, 1933) is an American author of romance and thriller novels, including nearly 150 best selling books with nearly 200 million copies in print. Her USA Today and New York Times best selling books include Family Blessings, Pretty Woman, and Crown Jewel, as well as the Texas quartet and the Captive series.

Biography
Fern Michaels is the pen name of Mary Ruth Kuczkir, who was born in Hastings, Pennsylvania on April 9, 1933, weighing only four and one-half pounds. Because of her small birth weight, Michaels' father nicknamed her "Dink," for "dinky little thing. Her family and friends still use the nickname. As a child, though, others referred to her as Ruth. Once she entered the business world, she became "Mary."

Michaels married, moved to New Jersey, and had five children. When the youngest entered school in 1973, her husband told her to get a job. Because she had no idea how to get a job, Michaels decided to try to write a book. Her husband was not very supportive of her efforts, and consequently they separated.

Although her first manuscript did not sell, the second did. Since then, Michaels has sold over sixty books, many of them New York Times bestsellers. She has been quoted as saying that she loves breathing life into her characters. She also loves writing books about women who prevail under difficult circumstances, which she feels reflect her struggle for success early in her career. For her efforts, she has been inducted into the New Jersey Literary Hall of Fame.

When she was a girl, Michaels' grandmother told her "when God is good to you, you have to give back". With this in mind, she founded the Fern Michaels Foundation, which grants four year scholarships for deserving students. In addition to that, she has also helped establish pre-school and day care programs with affordable rates for single mothers.

Michaels currently lives in Summerville, South Carolina, in a 300-year-old plantation house listed in the Historic Registry. She claims to share the house with a ghost named Mary Margaret (which had also been documented by the previous owners). Mary Margaret is said to leave messages on her computer.

Bibliography

Captives
Captive Passions (1977)
Captive Embraces (1979)
Captive Splendors (1980)
Captive Secrets (1991)
Note: Captive Innocence (1981) is not part of this series. It is a separate novel.

Texas
Texas Rich (1985)
Texas Heat (1986)
Texas Fury (1989)
Texas Trilogy (omnibus) (1991)
Texas Sunrise (1993)

Sins
Sins of Omission (1989)
Sins of the Flesh (1990)

Vegas
Vegas Rich (1996)
Vegas Heat (1997)
Vegas Sunrise (1998)
Vegas Trilogy (omnibus) (2001)

Kentucky
Kentucky Rich (2001)
Kentucky Heat (2002)
Kentucky Sunrise (2002)

Sisterhood
1. Weekend Warriors (2003)
2. Payback (2004)
3. Vendetta (2005)
4. The Jury (2005)
5. Sweet Revenge (2006)
6. Lethal Justice (2006)
7. Free Fall (2007)
8. Hide and Seek (2007)
9. Hokus Pokus (2007)
10. Fast Track (2008)
11. Collateral Damage (2008)
12. Final Justice (2008)
13. Under the Radar (2009)
14. Razor Sharp (2009)
15. Vanishing Act (2009)
16. Deadly Deals (2009)
17. Game Over (2010)
18. Cross Roads (2010)
19. Déjà Vu (2010)
20. Home Free (2011)
21. Gotcha (2013)
22. Blindsided (2013)
23. Kiss and Tell (2014)
24. Eyes Only (2014)
25. In Plain Sight (2015)
26. Point Blank (2015)
27. Crash and Burn (2016)
28. Need to Know (2017)
29. Safe and Sound (2018)
30. Cut and Run (August 27, 2019)
31. Truth and Justice (2020)
32. Bitter Pill (2020)
33. Yellow Moon Road (2021)

Cisco
No Place Like Home (2002)
Family Blessings (2004)

The Godmothers
The Scoop (2009)
Exclusive (2010)
Late Edition (2011)
Deadline (2012)
Breaking News (2012)
Classified (2013)
Hideaway (2017) e-novella
Getaway (2017) e-novella
Spirited Away (2017) e-novella
Far and Away (omnibus: contains-Hideaway, Getaway, and Spirited Away) (2019)

Men of the Sisterhood
Double Down (2015) (also published as Upside Down + Countdown + Take Down)
Fast and Loose (2016)
High Stakes (2017)
Truth or Dare (2018)
Hot Shot (August 27, 2019)

Stand Alone Novels
Pride and Passion (1975)
Vixen in Velvet (1976)
Valentina (1978)
Whitefire (1978) (written as Iris Summers)
Sea Gypsy (1980)
The Delta Ladies (1980)
Whisper My Name (1981)
Golden Lasso (1981)
Beyond Tomorrow (1981)
Paint Me Rainbows (1981)
Captive Innocence (1981)
Night Star (1982)
Tender Warrior (1982)
Wild Honey (1982)
Picture Perfect (1982)
All She Can be (1983)
Free Spirit (1983)
Cinders to Satin (1984)
To Taste the Wine (1987)
For All Their Lives (1991)
Seasons of Her Life (1994)
To Have and to Hold (1994)
Desperate Measures (1994)
Serendipity (1994)
Yesterday (1995)
Wish List (1995)
Dear Emily (1995)
Whitefire (1997)
Finders Keepers (1998)
Sara's Song (1998)
Annie's Rainbow (1999)
Celebration (1999)
Split Second (1999)
The Guest List (2000)
Picture Perfect (2000)
Listen to Your Heart (2000)
What You Wish for (2000)
Charming Lily (2001)
Plain Jane (2001)
The Future Scrolls (2001)
Late Bloomer (2002)
About Face (2003)
Trading Places (2003)
Crown Jewel (2003)
The Real Deal (2004)
The Nosy Neighbor (2005)
Pretty Woman (2005)
Fool Me Once (2006)
Hey, Good Looking (2006)
The Marriage Game (2007)
Up Close and Personal (2007)
Mr. and Mrs. Anonymous (2009)
I'll Be Home for Christmas (2010)
Return To Sender (2010)
Christmas at Timberwoods (2011) (reissue of Split Second.)
Betrayal (2011)
Southern Comfort (2011)
Tuesday's Child (2012)
Fancy Dancer (2012)
Forget Me Not (2013)
The Blossom Sisters (2013)
A Family Affair (2014)
Wishes for Christmas (2015)
Perfect Match (2015)
No Safe Secret (2016)
Holly and Ivy (2017)
Sweet Vengeance (2018)
Deep Harbor (2019)
Spirit of the Season (September 24, 2019)

Omnibuses/Collections
Desperate Needs (1995) (with Emilie Richards and Sherryl Woods)
A Joyous Season (1996) (with Olga Bicos, Jennifer Blake, and Hannah Howell)
Heartbreak Ranch (1997) (with Dorsey Kelley, Chelley Kitzmiller, Jill Marie Landis)
Homecoming (1997) (with Deborah Bedford, Janet Dailey, Dinah McCall)
Heart of the Home (1997) (with Denise Domning, Brenda Joyce and Bronwyn Williams)
Through the Years (1999) (with Linda Howard, Debbie Macomber)
Five Golden Rings (2000) (with Jo Beverley, Brenda Joyce and Katherine Sutcliffe)
Shattered Night: Split Second and Picture Perfect (2001)
The Delta Ladies / Wild Honey (2002)
Maybe This Time (2003) (with Emilie Richards and Sherryl Woods)
Let It Snow (2003) (with Holly Chamberlin, Marcia Evanick, Virginia Henley)
Jingle All the Way (2004) (with Theresa Alan, Jane Blackwood and Linda Lael Miller)
Deck the Halls (2004) (with Marcia Evanick, Virginia Henley, Lisa Jackson, and Linda Lael Miller)
Dream of Me: Whisper My Name / Paint Me Rainbows (2004)
Weekend Warriors / Payback (2005)
Sugar and Spice (2006) (with Beverly Barton, Joanne Fluke, Shirley Jump)
Captive Passions / Captive Embraces (2006)
Captive Splendors / Captive Secrets (2006)
Texas Fury / Texas Sunrise (2006)
Texas Rich / Texas Heat (2006)
Comfort and Joy (2007) (with Marie Bostwick, Cathy Lamb, and Deborah J. Wolf)
Promises: Nightstar/Beyond Tomorrow (2008)
Silver Bells (2008) (with Mary Burton, Judy Duarte, and JoAnn Ross
Snow Angels (2009) (with Marie Bostwick, Janna McMahan, and Rosalind Noonan)
Wildflowers: Sea Gypsy/Golden Lasso (2010)
Holiday Magic (2010) (with Mary Carter, Terri Dulong, and Cathy Lamb)
Making Spirits Bright (2011) (with Elizabeth Bass, Rosalind Noonan, Nan Rossiter)
Coming Home for Christmas: Silver Bells/Snow Angels/Holiday Magic (2012)
A Winter Wonderland (2012) (with Holly Chamberlin, Kristina McMorris, and Leslie Meier)
Balancing Act: All She Can Be/Free Spirit (2013)
Secret Santa (2013) (with Marie Bostwick, Laura Levine, and Cindy Myers)
When the Snow Falls (2014) (with Nancy Bush, Rosanna Chiofalo, and Lin Stepp)
The Most Wonderful Time (2016) (with Stacy Finz, Shirlee McCoy, and Sarah Title)
Winter Wishes (2017) (with Jules Bennett, Leah Marie Brown, and Susan Fox)
Mistletoe Magic: Making Spirits Bright/Mister Christmas/A Winter Wonderland/Candy Canes and Cupid (2017)
Fate & Fortune: Vixen in Velvet/Whitefire (2018)
A Season to Celebrate (2018) (with Donna Kauffman, Priscilla Oliveras, and Kate Pearce)
A Snowy Little Christmas (October 29, 2019) (with Kate Clayborn and Tara Sheets)

Sources

External links

Official website

20th-century American novelists
21st-century American novelists
American women novelists
American romantic fiction writers
Living people
1933 births
People from Summerville, South Carolina
Women romantic fiction writers
20th-century American women writers
21st-century American women writers